Samuel Tranks (born December 14, 1986 in Philadelphia, Pennsylvania) is a professional Canadian football wide receiver who is currently a free agent. He most recently played for the Toronto Argonauts of the Canadian Football League. He played college football for the Seton Hill Griffins.

References

1986 births
Living people
American players of Canadian football
American football wide receivers
Canadian football wide receivers
Players of Canadian football from Philadelphia
Toronto Argonauts players
Players of American football from Philadelphia